Lella Vignelli (born Elena Valle, August 13, 1934December 22, 2016) was an Italian architect, designer, and businesswomen. She collaborated closely throughout much of her life with her husband Massimo Vignelli, with whom she founded Vignelli Associates in 1971.  She was known for the "spare, elegant style" of her architectural and industrial design work, as well as her management skills and entrepreneurial expertise. She is famously quoted as saying that, "If you do it right, it will last forever."

Early life and education

Lella Vignelli was born in Udine, Italy. She married Massiomo Vignelli in 1957. She received her degree in architecture from the Università IUAV di Venezia, followed by a funded fellowship as a scholar at the MIT School of Architecture. In 1962, she became a registered architect in Milan.

Work

Starting in the mid-1950s, Lella Vignelli's professional concentration was interior, furniture, and product design. She was also involved in the formation of the ADI (Associazione per il Disegno Industriale), an Italian professional design organization which was founded in 1956.

In 1959, she joined architecture firm Skidmore, Owings & Merrill in Chicago as a junior interior designer. The following year the Vignellis established the Massimo and Lella Vignelli Office of Design and Architecture in Milan. Lella specialized in interior architecture, furniture, exhibition, and product design.

She was one of the founders of the corporate design consultancy Unimark International, along with Massimo, Bob Noorda, and Ralph Eckerstrom. At Unimark, Lella Vignelli served as the head of the interiors department in Milan beginning in 1965. Shortly thereafter, she became the executive interior designer of Unimak's New York office.

Some of the Vignellis' notable designs from this period are their brand identity commissions for clients such as Knoll International, for which they led a comprehensive review of the company's visual presence starting in 1965; the graphic identity and logo of American Airlines, designed in 1967; as well the design of as a collection of melamine plastic stacking dinnerware for Articoli Plastici Elettrici in 1964 (later marketed in America by Heller). The Vignelli Stacking Dinnerware was still in production in 2023, nearly 60 years after it was first introduced. 

In 1971, the Vignellis established Vignelli Associates and opened offices in New York, Paris, and Milan. The firm's commissions included corporate identity programmes for Bloomingdale's department store in 1972, Lancia automobiles in 1978, and Ducati motorcycles in 1992, as well as the signage system for the Guggenheim Museum Bilbao in 1997. Lella continued to focus on the three-dimensional design work of the practice, and also served as Chief Executive.

Vignelli Associates was commissioned to design the graphic identity, signage systems, and subway map for the New York City Subway in 1972. The design was based on "abstract simplicity" with all of the subway lines indicated using straight, vertical, horizontal, or diagonal lines arranged at either 45 or 90 degree angles. Each subway line is indicated using a unique color, while the stops are designated with a simple black dot. This color-scheme is repeated on the corresponding colored circular icons on the signage throughout the subway system, platforms, and trains. That map was met with some criticism for being difficult to understand, although it has been described as "a cult phenomenon for generations of graphic designers".

In 1978, the Vignellis founded Vignelli Designs, a separate company which focused on product and furniture design, and for which Lella served as president. Their furniture designs included the Handkerchief chair for Knoll (1985); the Serenissimo table (1985) for Italian manufacturer Acerbis; and the Magic coffee table (1990) for Acerbis's lower-priced Morphos label. Other Vignelli designs have included retail layouts for Artemide, jewelry for Cleto Munari, and glassware for Venini and Steuben Glass Works.

LelIa Vignelli also collaborated closely with the architect Denise Scott Brown, and was a frequent speaker and juror for national and international design organizations. She was a member of the Industrial Designers Society of America
(IDSA), the American Institute of Graphic Arts (AIGA), the International
Furnishings and Designer Association (IFDA), and the Decorators Club of New York.

Legacy
Lella and Massimo Vignelli were described as "iconic, impossibly exotic characters" in New York. In 1982, they were both awarded the AIGA Gold Medal for their achievements and contributions to design. The AIGA described their design output together as "prodigious in quantity, far-ranging in media and scope and consistent in excellence."

Even though their accomplishments belong to both Lella and Massimo, Lella's critical eye guided the rational and geometric language one can find in their work.

Lella Vignelli died in her home in Manhattan on December 22, 2016, at age 82 from dementia.

Vignelli Center for Design Studies

Massimo and Lella Vignelli agreed to donate the entire archive of their design work in 2008 to the Rochester Institute of Technology, near Rochester, New York. The archive is held in a new building  designed by Lella and Massimo Vignelli called The Vignelli Center for Design Studies which opened in September 2010. As well as storage and conservation facilities for the archives the Vignelli Center includes exhibition spaces, classrooms, and offices.

Awards
Lella and Massimo's work has been recognized by the following:

 1964 Gran Premio Triennale of Milan
 1964 and 1989 Compasso d'Oro Awards
 1973 American Institute of Architects (AlA) Industrial Arts Medal
 1982 Laurea honoris causa Parsons School of Design, New York
 1983 American Institute of Graphic Arts (AIGA) Gold Medal
 1985 Presidential Design Award
 1988 Interior Design Hall of Fame
 1991 National Arts Club Gold Medal for Design
 1992 Interior Product Designers Fellowship of Excellence
 1994 Laurea honoris causa Corcoran School of Art, Washington D.C.
 1995 Brooklyn Museum Design Award for Lifetime Achievement
 2003 National Lifetime Achievement Award dal National Museum of Design at Cooper-Hewitt, New York.
 2004 Visionary Award from dal Museum of Art and Design, New York.
 2005 Architecture Award dall'American Academy of Arts and Letters, New York.
 2011 President’s Medal of the Architectural League of New York
 2011 Lifetime Achievement Award at AD 20/21
 Appraisal in Emilio Ambasz's book of essays, Design: Vignelli (1980), first published by the Comune di Milan, and republished by Rizzol in 1981 and 1990.

Corporate identity programs 
 American Airlines, 1967
 Bloomingdale's, New York, 1972
 Knoll International Graphic Program, 1966-1980
 Xerox, 1985-1989 — In collaboration with Jay Doblin Associates and Jack Hough Associates
 United States National Park Service, 1977
 Ciga Hotels, 1978
 Sotheby's Graphic Program, 1981-1982
 Aetna Life and Casualty, 1988
 Park Tower Realty, 1985-1988
 Fodor's travel guides

Product design 
 Heller stacking dinnerware, 1964
 Handkerchief chair for Knoll, 1983

Packaging 
 Bloomingdale's, 1972
 Barney's, 1977
 Saks Fifth Avenue, 1978
 IBM, 1984-1986

Transportation graphics 
 New York Metropolitan Transit Authority, 1966
 Washington Metro Transportation, 1968

Philosophy of design
Vignelli believed that all design should stem from a core discipline that could be translated to any project. She also believed that design should be integrated into the production process instead of added superficially at the end.

Vignelli's design is centered on communication through simplicity and careful planning. She used subtractive design, rather than additive design, to restrain her own influence and allow the essence of the design to come through. Emphasis was placed on existing and ancient motifs and elements, as well as materials' natural characteristics. She viewed words as a way to communicate actual ideas rather than serving as visual decoration, and this is evidenced by her heavy use of black text on a white background. In general, color was used for its emotional and sensual power.

As Vignelli Associates, Lella and Massimo's designs embraced corporate identity design alongside publication, exhibition, furniture, product, jewellery, silver, and clothing design.

Quotations

Publications

References

External links
Vignelli Center for Design Studies Rochester Institute of Technology (RIT)
Designed by: Lella Vignelli (book)
Design Is One, documentary (trailer)
Interior Design: The New Freedom, (Barbaralee Diamonstein-Spielvogel television interview, 1981), David M. Rubenstein Rare Book and Manuscript Library, Duke University

1934 births
2016 deaths
Italian women architects
People from Udine
AIGA medalists
Italian designers
Italian furniture designers
Italian industrial designers
Designers
Olivetti people
Industrial design